Stone House, also known as the Zachariah Johnson House, is a historic home located near Lexington, Rockbridge County, Virginia. It was built in 1797, and is a -story, five bay, stone dwelling.  It has a side gable roof, interior end chimneys, and a central-hall-plan.  The front facade features a rough-hewn, four columned portico with pediment.

It was listed on the National Register of Historic Places in 1979.

References

External links
Stone House, State Route 687, Lexington, Lexington, VA: 6 photos, 6 data pages, and 1 photo caption page at Historic American Buildings Survey

Historic American Buildings Survey in Virginia
Houses on the National Register of Historic Places in Virginia
Houses completed in 1797
Houses in Rockbridge County, Virginia
National Register of Historic Places in Rockbridge County, Virginia
1797 establishments in Virginia